Liberal is the county seat of Seward County, Kansas, United States.  As of the 2020 census, the population of the city was 19,825.  Liberal is home of Seward County Community College.

History 

Early settler S. S. Rogers built the first house in what would become Liberal in 1888. Rogers became famous in the region for giving free water to thirsty travelers.  Reportedly, Liberal gained its name from the common response to his acts of kindness, "That's very liberal of you." In 1885 Rogers built a general store, and with it came an official U.S. Post Office. Rogers named the post office 'Liberal'. After the railroad was built close by, a plan for the town site was created in 1888. A year later the population was around 800.

Drought caused some farmers to give up and look for more fertile territory; however, when the nearby Indian Territory was opened, more settlers headed to the cheap land that would become Oklahoma.

Natural gas was discovered west of town, in what would become part of the massive Panhandle-Hugoton Gas Field, in 1920. Oil was discovered southwest of town in 1951. In 1963 the largest helium plant in the world, National Helium, was opened.

Geography
Liberal is located at  (37.043418, −100.928133) at an elevation of 2,835 feet (864 m).

Climate
Liberal has a semi-arid steppe climate (Köppen BSk) characterized by hot, dry summers, cool, dry winters, and large diurnal temperature variation year-round; relative humidity averages 63%. On average, January is the coldest month, July is the hottest month, and June is the wettest month.

The high temperature reaches or exceeds  an average of 80 days a year and  an average of 18 days. The minimum temperature falls to or below  on an average 5.3 days a year.

On average, Liberal receives  of precipitation annually, a majority of which occurs from May to August, and records 58 days of measurable precipitation.  Measurable snowfall occurs an average of 8.9 days per year with 6.1 days receiving at least . Snow depth of at least one inch occurs an average of 9.5 days a year. Typically, the average window for freezing temperatures is October 21 through April 14, and that for temperatures below  from January 5 to January 24. Liberal is located in USDA Plant Hardiness Zone 7.

Demographics

2010 census
As of the 2010 census, there were 20,525 people, 6,623 households, and 4,838 families residing in the city. The racial makeup of the city was 68.6% White, 3.7% African American, 2.9% Asian, 0.8% American Indian, 0.2% Pacific Islander, 20.6% from other races, and 3.2% from two or more races. Hispanics and Latinos of any race made up 58.7% of the population.

There were 6,623 households, of which 42.3% had children under the age of 18 living with them, 52.7% were married couples living together, 7.1% had a male householder with no wife present, 13.2% had a female householder with no husband present, and 27.0% were non-families. 21.7% of all households were made up of individuals, and 7.5% had someone living alone who was 65 years of age or older. The average household size was 3.03, and the average family size was 3.54.

The median age was 28.4 years. 32.1% of residents were under the age of 18; 12.4% were between the ages of 18 and 24; 27.8% were from 25 to 44; 19.4% were from 45 to 64; and 8.3% were 65 years of age or older. The gender makeup of the city population was 51.4% male and 48.6% female.

The median income for a household in the city was $40,247, and the median income for a family was $44,167. Males had a median income of $31,435 versus $25,208 for females. The per capita income for the city was $17,668. About 15.3% of families and 17.8% of the population were below the poverty line, including 23.6% of those under age 18 and 8.2% of those age 65 or over.

2000 census
As of the census of 2000, there were 19,666 people, 6,498 households, and 4,756 families residing in the city. The racial makeup of the city was 63.56% White, 4.21% African American, 0.72% Native American, 3.25% Asian, 0.06% Pacific Islander, 23.93% from other races, and 3.27% from two or more races. 43.30% of the population were Hispanic or Latino of any race.

There were 6,498 households, out of which 42.8% had children under the age of 18 living with them, 58.0% were married couples living together, 10.4% had a female householder with no husband present, and 26.8% were non-families. 21.3% of all households were made up of individuals, and 8.1% had someone living alone who was 65 years of age or older. The average household size was 2.96 and the average family size was 3.46.

In the city, the population was spread out, with 31.7% under the age of 18, 12.1% from 18 to 24, 30.5% from 25 to 44, 16.7% from 45 to 64, and 9.1% who were 65 years of age or older. The median age was 29 years. For every 100 females, there were 104.6 males. For every 100 females age 18 and over, there were 103.3 males.

The median income for a household in the city was $36,482, and the median income for a family was $41,134. Males had a median income of $29,315 versus $22,017 for females. The per capita income for the city was $15,108. About 14.3% of families and 17.7% of the population were below the poverty line, including 21.8% of those under age 18 and 7.6% of those age 65 or over.

Economy 

Energy and agriculture are the main economic drivers of the area. Natural resources include oil, natural gas, water, gravel and sand. The beef industry (ranches, feed lots and packing plants) is Liberal's largest source of employment. Hard winter wheat, corn, milo, alfalfa and cotton are common crops. Trucking is a major industry. Dairies and pork processors are a growing business.

, 70.2% of the population over the age of 16 was in the labor force. 0.0% was in the armed forces, and 70.2% was in the civilian labor force with 63.4% being employed and 6.9% unemployed. The composition, by occupation, of the employed civilian labor force was:  28.5% in production, transportation, and material moving; 20.0% in natural resources, construction, and maintenance; 19.9% in sales and office occupations; 18.9% in management, business, science, and arts; and 12.6% in service occupations. The three industries employing the largest percentages of the working civilian labor force were:  manufacturing (24.4%); educational services, health care, and social assistance (19.4%); and retail trade (10.5%).

The cost of living in Liberal is relatively low; compared to a U.S. average of 100, the cost of living index for the city is 80.8. , the median home value in the city was $85,600, the median selected monthly owner cost was $961 for housing units with a mortgage and $383 for those without, and the median gross rent was $648.

Top employers
According to Liberal's 2011 Comprehensive Annual Financial Report, the top 10 employers in the city are:

Government
Liberal has a commission-manager government with a city commission consisting of five members elected at-large. Elections occur every two years in the odd numbered year, and commissioners serve two-year or four-year terms depending on the number of votes they receive. Each year, the commission appoints a member to serve as mayor and another to serve as vice-mayor. The city manager heads the city administration.

Education

Colleges
 Seward County Community College

Primary and secondary
The community is served by Liberal USD 480 public school district, which operates twelve schools in the city:

 Bright Start Pre-K Center (Pre-K)
 Cottonwood Elementary School (K–5)
 MacArthur Elementary School (K–5)
 Meadowlark Elementary School (K–5)
 Prairie View Elementary School (K–5)
 Sunflower Intermediate School (K–5)

 Eisenhower Middle School (6–8)
 Seymour Rogers Middle School (6–8)
 Liberal High School (9–12)

There is also a Christian school in Liberal: Fellowship Baptist School (K–12).

Transportation
U.S. Route 83 runs north-south along the east side of the city, intersecting U.S. Route 54 which runs northeast-southwest. In addition, Liberal is the western terminus of U.S. Route 270 which runs concurrently with U.S. 83 south from the city.

Liberal Mid-America Regional Airport is immediately west of the city. Publicly owned, it has two operative paved runways and is used primarily for general aviation. United Express provides airline service with daily flights to Denver.

The Tucumcari Line of the Union Pacific Railroad runs parallel to U.S. 54 northeast-southwest through the city.

Media

Four newspapers are published in Liberal. The Leader & Times is the city's main daily newspaper, published six days a week. It is the result of the merger between the city's two previous dailies, the High Plains Daily Leader and the Southwest Daily Times. The publisher of the Leader & Times also prints a weekly Spanish language paper, El Lider. Seward County Community College publishes a bi-weekly student newspaper, the Crusader. The fourth paper is the Liberal Light, published weekly.

Liberal is a center of broadcast media for southwest Kansas and the Oklahoma Panhandle. Two AM and seven FM radio stations are licensed to and broadcast from the city. Liberal is in the Wichita-Hutchinson, Kansas television market, and one television station broadcasts from the city: KSWE-LD, a sister station of KDGL-LD in Sublette, Kansas.

On cable, viewers can receive stations from the Wichita/Hutchinson market (via semi-satellite stations in Garden City/Ensign), PBS' Tulsa affiliate, KOED, as well as Amarillo, Texas's CBS affiliate, KFDA-TV.

Culture

Events
Liberal is famous for its annual Pancake Day race that is held in competition with the town of Olney, United Kingdom for the fastest time between both cities.

Points of interest

Liberal has a water park known as Adventure Bay.

The fifth largest collection of civilian and military aircraft in the United States is located at the Mid-America Air Museum. Started with a gift of fifty planes by General Tom (Thomas) Welch, Jr., the museum has more than one hundred aircraft.

The Coronado Museum has items from the Native Americans that lived in the area, as well as items from Francisco Vásquez de Coronado's expedition to the area in 1541, and the history of farming and ranching in the county in more recent times.

Liberal is home to "The Land of Oz" exhibit from The Wizard of Oz, a recreation of Dorothy Gale's house and the famed Yellow Brick Road, featuring donated bricks bearing the names of former U.S. Senator Bob Dole, Ronald and Nancy Reagan, and Liza Minnelli (Judy Garland's daughter). This exhibit was originally designed and displayed for Topeka in 1981, but relocated here eleven years later by its creator Linda Windler.

Liberal Memorial Library is located on North Kansas Avenue between Fifth and Sixth Streets in Cooper Park.  The Book Front entrance was completed in April 1955 and designed by the building's architect George L. Pitcher.  Wheeler Williams, a sculptor from New York, signed an agreement in October 1960 to mold the "Pioneer Mother of Kansas."  This six foot statue, sponsored by Mr. and Mrs. D. K. Baty, was to be erected in Cooper Park on Memorial Day, May 30, 1961.  It was placed opposite of the "Statue of Liberty," which was donated and placed in Cooper Park by the Boy Scouts of America.

Sports
The Liberal Bee Jays, a semi-professional baseball team, have won five national championships and 13 state championships. The Bee Jays have been coached by three major league managers and have sent 165 players to the major leagues.

In popular culture
 B. H. Fairchild wrote the poem, "At the Excavation of Liberal, Kansas" (in: The Art of the Lathe, Alice James Books, 1998), in memory of William Stafford; it contains Stafford's poem, "What I Heard Whispered at the Edge of Liberal, Kansas" (from: Stories That Could Be True: New and Collected Poems, Harper and Row, 1977).
 In the film National Lampoon's Vacation, Clark W. Griswold suggests altering the family's route of travel in order to visit Liberal so they can see the world's largest house of mud.  The idea is rejected by his wife, Ellen, in favor of getting to her cousin Eddie's home.
 Season 4, Episode 9 of Fargo is set in Liberal.

Notable people

Notable individuals who were born in and/or have lived in Liberal include:

 Wayne Angell (born 1930), economist
 Chris Brown, college football coach
 Lamar Chapman (born 1976), NFL and CFL player
 Wantha Davis (1917–2012), horse racing jockey
 Kasey Hayes (born 1985), professional bull rider
 Kristin Key (born 1980), comedian
 Shalee Lehning (born 1986), Women's National Basketball Association guard
 M. C. Leist (1942–2022), Oklahoma state legislator
 Martin Lewis (born 1975), National Basketball Association forward
 Laura Gibbs Maczka, mayor, Richardson, Texas

 Kelli McCarty (born 1969), 1991 Miss Kansas USA and Miss USA, actress
 Jerrod Niemann (born 1979), country music singer/songwriter
 Kelly Overton, animal rights activist and author
 Melvin Sanders (born 1981), professional basketball guard/forward
 William Stafford (1914–1993), poet
 Doug Terry (born 1968), National Football League defensive back
 Dallas Trahern (born 1985), Major League Baseball pitcher
 Jerame Tuman (born 1976), National Football League tight end
 Larry D. Welch (born 1934), U.S. Air Force General

References

Further reading

External links

 
 Liberal - Directory of Public Officials
 Liberal Economic Development
 USD 480, local school district
 Liberal city map, KDOT

 
Cities in Kansas
County seats in Kansas
Cities in Seward County, Kansas
Micropolitan areas of Kansas